Jules Chancel (25 September 1867 – 20 January 1944) was a French journalist and writer, particularly active in books for children.

Biography 
A nephew of Jules Charles-Roux, he is the father of Jean-Louis Chancel and Ludovic Chancel.

Volunteer in the army, he was seconded to the British staff as war correspondent for the L'Illustration newspaper. As journalist, he has collaborated namely for L'Illustration, the Figaro, the L'Écho de Paris and the Excelsior.

Playwright and children's books author, his best known series are Children through history and Children in the colonies. Several of his works were crowned by the Académie française.

These books were illustrated by illustrators of the time like Raymond de La Nézière or Jules Fontanez.

Works 
Children through history:
Cocorico 1596–1651 reître d'Henri IV illustrated by Edmond Gros
Petit marmiton, grand musicien 1625–1650 illustrated by Jules Fontanez
Le petit fauconnier de Louis XIII dito
Les Petits Ménétriers de Duguay-Trouin 1711, illustrated by Edmond  Gros  
Le petit jockey du duc de Lauzun. Epoque 1785–1793. illustrated by Raymond de La Nézière
Le moucheron de Bonaparte. 1795–1805 illustrated by Raymond de La Nézière
Tiarko le chevrier de Napoléon 1805–1815 Tiarko le chevrier de Napoléon

Children in colonies
Lulu au Maroc 
Le prince Mokoko 
1910 : Le petit Roi du Masque Noir.  éd. Delagrave (Paris)
Le secret de l'Emir. 
Un petit émigrant en Argentine illustrations by L. Bombled
Un petit comédien au Brésil illustrations by Raymond de La Nézière
1917 : Sous le masque allemand. Guerre franco-allemande (1914–1917). Delagrave
1919 : Un match Franco-Américain La grande guerre (1914–1919) Delagrave Paris

Adaptation 

French children's writers
19th-century French journalists
French male journalists
19th-century French military personnel
Chevaliers of the Légion d'honneur
Writers from Marseille
1867 births
1944 deaths
19th-century French male writers